The Mayflower line is a railway branch line in the east of England that links , on the Great Eastern Main Line, to . The Mayflower line has six stations, including the two termini, and is situated within the county of Essex.

It is part of Network Rail Strategic Route 7, SRS 07.07, and is classified as a London and South East commuter line. The Engineer's Line Reference for the line is MAH.

As of December 2016 passenger services on the Mayflower line are operated by Greater Anglia, which also manages all of the stations. The typical service frequency is one train per hour in each direction. The timetabled journey time between Manningtree and Harwich Town is 22 minutes.

The Mayflower line takes its name from the Pilgrim ship Mayflower, which is believed to have been built in Harwich in the 16th century. Harwich was also home to the ship's captain and part-owner, Christopher Jones.

History
The Eastern Counties Railway (ECR) had originally proposed plans to extend what is now the Great Eastern Main Line from Colchester to Harwich, although this was a cause for concern to the town of Ipswich, which was a rival port.

In 1846 a railway line from Manningtree to Harwich proposed by the Eastern Union Railway (EUR) was approved by the Railway Commissioners. In 1853 an agreement was reached between the companies, with the ECR taking over the working of the EUR from 1 January 1854. The single-line branch opened on 15 August 1854.

In 1862 the ECR and the EUR merged to form the Great Eastern Railway (GER).

There was a relatively extensive system of sidings fed from a spur on the "down" (Harwich-bound) side which was controlled by a signal box which was in use from 1918 until 1966. Use of the halt was confined to Admiralty employees only during various periods.

This spur was controlled by a signal box, named Primrose Box, reflecting the profusion of primroses which grew lineside in the area.

In 1948 following nationalisation the line became part of British Railways Eastern Region.

By the late 1970s the costs of running the dated mechanical signalling systems north of Colchester was recognised and in 1978 a scheme for track rationalisation and re-signalling was duly submitted to the Department of Transport.  This was followed by a proposal to electrify the Great Eastern Main Line and branch to Harwich in 1980. Electrification work was undertaken in the early – mid 1980s.

In 1982 British Railways sectorised their operations and the branch fell under the London & South East (later renamed Network SouthEast in 1986).
  
On 14 April 1985 the first electric train consisting of two Class 308 electric multiple units (EMU) worked the line although the previous year another member of the class had been dragged from Ipswich to Parkeston and used for crew training. The following day a Class 86 locomotive visited the branch to test various sidings and crossings on the line. The full electric service was introduced on 12 May 1985 with InterCity Class 86s working the Liverpool Street boat trains and EMUs working local services.

Infrastructure

Until 2014, Esbjerg was connected by DFDS which is now closed. Beyond Harwich International, the original second track remains in place as a through siding, but only the "up" (Manningtree-bound) line was electrified and that section to the eastern terminus Harwich Town is bidirectional.

East of Manningtree there is a triangular junction that enables trains operating to the port to reach the branch from both the north and south.

Stations

Battery trains

In 2015 a trial of an electric overhead wire/battery train was undertaken on the line. A single Class 379 Electrostar, after installation of electric lithium batteries were installed, began a passenger service. The train could travel up to 60 miles on energy stored in the batteries also recharging the batteries via the overhead-wires when on electrified sections of the line, at stations, and via brake regeneration. Network Rail refer to this prototype model and its possible future descendants as "Independently Powered Electric Multiple Units" (IPEMU).

References

Rail transport in Essex
EA 1120
Railway lines in the East of England
Standard gauge railways in England